Lotte Card Co, Ltd. is a Korean credit card company. Headquartered in Seoul, Lotte Card has a partnership with Lotte Capital, and both companies are part of the Lotte Corporation. Lotte Card was established in December 2002 as a technical and business company licensed by American Express and Lotte Department Store.

External links
 

Card
Financial services companies of South Korea
Financial services companies established in 2002